Brendan Comiskey (born August 13, 1935), is the Roman Catholic Bishop Emeritus of the Diocese of Ferns. He was born in Clontibret, County Monaghan, Ireland.

He was ordained a priest of the little known Congregation of the Sacred Hearts of Jesus and Mary on 25 June 1961, and appointed Auxiliary Bishop of the Archdiocese of Dublin in 1979.

He was appointed Bishop of Ferns on 4 April 1984. 

He resigned on 1 April 2002, over charges that he had failed to deal adequately with allegations that Fr. Seán Fortune and others who were sexually abusing children.

Early career
Comiskey's early clerical career was extremely promising. He was head of his order in Ireland and the UK by the age of 34, became an auxiliary bishop in the Archdiocese of Dublin at age 45 and soon thereafter was appointed to the Diocese of Ferns at the age of 47. 
In 2016, his name still appeared on the website of his congregation where he said to be a retreat giver whose conferences are "filled with profound content mixed with wit and humour."

Diocese mired in clerical sexual abuse
Brendan Comiskey succeeded the ebullient but utterly ineffective Donal Herlihy as Bishop of Ferns in 1984. Herlihy, a former staff member at the Pontifical Irish College in Rome, is reported to have had alcohol-related issues in his last years as bishop and his governance of the diocese was slack.  

As a result of The Ferns Report, published by the Irish Government on 25 October 2005 into child sex abuse in this diocese (between 1962 and 2002), the wider Irish public became aware of a catalogue of abuse going back to Herlihy's tenure on office involving 100 individual cases involving 21 priests.

It is alleged that Tomás Ó Fiaich, Cardinal Archbishop of Armagh, had been told about the allegations, as had the Holy See.

Resignation
Comiskey resigned in 2002 after the transmission of the BBC documentary "Suing the Pope" amid allegations that he did not report allegations that Fr Sean Fortune had abused a number of children while Comiskey was in control of the diocese. Fortune was a serial paedophile with a manipulative personality and Comiskey admits he found him difficult to deal with. Fortune committed suicide while on bail.

According to the founder of the abuse victims' charity One in Four, Colm O'Gorman, Comiskey was not alone in his responsibility to report the allegations to civil authorities. O'Gorman is quoted as saying, "It would be sad if he (Comiskey) was ultimately scapegoated in all this and the church failed to accept full responsibility".

Bishop Éamonn Walsh was installed in March 2002 as Apostolic Administrator in Ferns and implemented a new child protection policy which resulted in many more historic allegations of child-sexual abuse emerging.

In 2014 Brendan Comiskey "broke his silence" on the child abuse scandal in Ireland claiming that he had done his best and "that he was deeply sorry for all that had happened,"

See also
Roman Catholic Church sex abuse scandal
Roman Catholic priests accused of sex offenses
Crimen sollicitationis

References

External links
BBC News story on Comiskey's resignation
RTÉ News story about Comiskey
Sunday Business Post 'Comiskey Proved A Formidable Foe'
 Congregation of the Sacred Hearts of Jesus and Mary

1935 births
People from County Monaghan
Living people
Catholic Church sexual abuse scandals in Ireland
Roman Catholic bishops of Ferns
21st-century Roman Catholic bishops in Ireland
Ecclesiastical passivity to Catholic sexual abuse cases
20th-century Roman Catholic bishops in Ireland